The Singles Collection or similar may refer to:

 The Singles Collection (Apoptygma Berzerk album), 2003
 The Singles Collection (Britney Spears album), 2009
 The Singles Collection (David Bowie album), 1993
 The Singles Collection (Jimi Hendrix album), 2003
 The Singles Collection (Shed Seven album), 2008
 The Singles Collection (Silversun Pickups album), 2014
 The Singles Collection (Spandau Ballet album), 1985
 The Singles Collection (The Specials album), 1991
 The Singles Collection (Terje Rypdal album), 1988
 Single Collection (Hitomi Yaida album), 2004
 Single Collection (Jun Shibata album), 2005
 The Singles Collection 1965–1976, 2005 album by BZN
 Singles Collection (The Coral album), 2008
 The Singles Collection: 1959 to 1966, 2002 album by Doris Day
 The Singles Collection 1984/1990, 1990 album by Jimmy Somerville, Bronski Beat and The Communards
 The Singles Collection, Volume 1 and Singles Collection, Volume 2 albums by Dropkick Murphys
 The Singles Collection 2001–2011 by Gorillaz
 Utada Hikaru Single Collection Vol. 1, 2004 album by Hikaru Utada
 Utada Hikaru Single Collection Vol. 2, 2010 album by Hikaru Utada
 The Single Collection, 2002 album by HIM
 Original Single Kollektion, 1998 boxed set by Rammstein
 Singles Collection: The London Years, 1989 album by The Rolling Stones
 Overloaded: The Singles Collection, 2006 album by the Sugababes
 The Singles Collection 1981–1993, 1993 album by Kim Wilde
 A Singles Collection, an album by Marillion

See also
 The Singles (disambiguation)
 The Singles Album (disambiguation)